Strumigenys inopinata is a species in the genus Strumigenys. It is found in Sri Lanka.

References

External links

 at antwiki.org

Myrmicinae
Hymenoptera of Asia